The 1893 international cricket season was from April 1893 to September 1893. The season consists with a single international tour.

Season overview

July

Australia in England

References

International cricket competitions by season
1893 in cricket